The year 1520 in science and technology included many events, some of which are listed here.

Botany
 Publication of Le Grant Herbier ("The Great Herbal") in Paris.

Exploration
 November 1–28 – Ferdinand Magellan's fleet makes the first passage of the Strait of Magellan and he names the Pacific Ocean.

Births
 approx. date – Vincenzo Galilei, Italian scientist and musician (died 1591)
 Agatha Streicher, German physician (died 1581)

Deaths
 approx. date – Pedro Álvares Cabral, Portuguese explorer (b. c. 1467/8).

References

 
16th century in science
1520s in science